In the 1937–38 season, USM Blida is competing in the Second Division for the 5th season French colonial era, as well as the Forconi Cup, and the North African Cup.

Pre-season

Competitions

Overview

Second Division

Play-off

Second Division title
Union Sportive Musulmane Blidéenne champion of group A against Stade Guyotville champion of group B

Promotion

North African Cup

League table

Group A

Playing statistics

|-
! colspan=12 style=background:#dcdcdc; text-align:center| Goalkeepers

|-
! colspan=12 style=background:#dcdcdc; text-align:center| Defenders

|-
! colspan=12 style=background:#dcdcdc; text-align:center| Midfielders

|-
! colspan=12 style=background:#dcdcdc; text-align:center| Forwards

|}

Goalscorers

References

External links
La Province sportive. Organe des clubs et sociétés sportives de province
L'Indépendant. Organe de défense des intérêts politiques et économiques de la 3e circonscription d'Alger, paraissant le jeudi
Le Tell : journal des intérêts coloniaux

USM Blida seasons
Algerian football clubs 1937–38 season